Idahlu (also Romanized as Īdahlū, Idehloo, and Īdehlū; also known as Īdāleh and Īdalū) is a village in Sardaran Rural District, in the Central District of Kabudarahang County, Hamadan Province, Iran. At the 2006 census, its population was 1,803, in 473 families.

References 

Populated places in Kabudarahang County